Bethany Lutheran Church may refer to:

Bethany Lutheran Church (Iron River, Michigan), listed on the National Register of Historic Places in Iron County, Michigan
Bethany Lutheran Church (Oilmont, Montana), listed on the National Register of Historic Places in Toole County, Montana
Bethany Lutheran Church, Ephraim, listed on the National Register of Historic Places in Door County, Wisconsin